The 2017 Stanford Classic (sponsored by Bank of the West) was a professional tennis tournament played on hard courts. It was the 46th edition of the tournament, and part of the WTA Premier tournaments of the 2017 WTA Tour. It took place in Stanford, California, United States between 31 July and 6 August 2017. It was the first women's event on the 2017 US Open Series. This event saw the top eight seeds make it to the quarterfinals, the first time since 2004 that this had happened at a WTA tournament.

Points and prize money

Point distribution

Prize money

Singles main-draw entrants

Seeds

 1 Rankings are as of July 24, 2017.

Other entrants
The following players received wildcards into the singles main draw:
  Petra Kvitová
  Claire Liu 
  Maria Sharapova

The following player received entry using a protected ranking:
  Ajla Tomljanović

The following players received entry from the qualifying draw:
  Verónica Cepede Royg 
  Caroline Dolehide 
  Marina Erakovic 
  Danielle Lao

Withdrawals
Before the tournament
  Tímea Babos →replaced by  Jennifer Brady
  Varvara Lepchenko →replaced by  Kateryna Bondarenko
  Kristýna Plíšková →replaced by  Ajla Tomljanović
  Kateřina Siniaková →replaced by  Kayla Day
  Wang Qiang →replaced by  Kristie Ahn

During the tournament
  Maria Sharapova

Doubles main-draw entrants

Seeds

1 Rankings are as of July 24, 2017.

Other entrants 
The following pair received a wildcard into the main draw:
  Melissa Lord /  Carol Zhao

Withdrawals

  Marina Erakovic /  Ajla Tomljanović

Finals

Singles

  Madison Keys def.  CoCo Vandeweghe, 7–6(7–4), 6–4

Doubles

  Abigail Spears /  CoCo Vandeweghe def.  Alizé Cornet /  Alicja Rosolska, 6–2, 6–3

References

External links
Official website

2017 WTA Tour
2017
Sports in Stanford, California
2017 in sports in California
2017 in American tennis